WCCW might refer to:

 WCCW (AM), a radio station at 1310 AM licensed to Traverse City, Michigan
 WCCW-FM, a radio station at 107.5 FM licensed to Traverse City, Michigan
 World Class Championship Wrestling, defunct professional wrestling promotion based in Texas which went out of business in 1990
Women's Center for Creative Work, is a network of women based in Los Angeles who promote art and feminism.
 Washington Corrections Center for Women, a woman's prison in Gig Harbor, Washington